Donald Ellsworth Walter (born March 15, 1936) is a senior United States district judge of the United States District Court for the Western District of Louisiana, based in Shreveport.

Education and career
He was born in Jennings in Jefferson Davis Parish in southwestern Louisiana. He was an enlisted soldier in the United States Army from 1957 to 1958 and was stationed at Fort Bliss. He received a Bachelor of Arts degree from Louisiana State University in 1961 and a Juris Doctor from Paul M. Hebert Law Center at Louisiana State University in 1964. He was in private practice in Lake Charles, Louisiana, from 1964 to 1969 and was the United States Attorney for the Western District of Louisiana from 1969 to 1977.

Federal judicial service
On May 15, 1985, Walter was nominated by President Ronald Reagan to a new seat on the United States District Court for the Western District of Louisiana created by 98 Stat. 333. He was confirmed by the United States Senate on July 10, 1985, receiving his commission the following day. Walter assumed senior status on November 30, 2001.

References

Sources

1936 births
Living people
Louisiana State University Law Center alumni
United States Attorneys for the Western District of Louisiana
Judges of the United States District Court for the Western District of Louisiana
United States district court judges appointed by Ronald Reagan
20th-century American judges
United States Army soldiers
Louisiana Republicans
People from Jennings, Louisiana
People from Lake Charles, Louisiana
People from Shreveport, Louisiana
Military personnel from Louisiana
21st-century American judges